The Parapaguridae are a family of marine hermit crabs from deep waters. Instead of carrying empty gastropod shells like other hermit crabs, they carry colonies of dozen or more sea anemones or zoanthids. Some genera, such as Bivalvopagurus and Tylaspis, do not inhabit shells. The following genera are included:

Bivalvopagurus Lemaitre, 1993
Oncopagurus Lemaitre, 1996
Paragiopagurus Lemaitre, 1996
Parapagurus Smith, 1879
Probeebei Boone, 1926
Strobopagurus Lemaitre, 1989
Sympagurus Smith, 1883
Tsunogaipagurus Osawa, 1995
Tylaspis Henderson, 1885
Typhlopagurus de Saint Laurent, 1972

References

External links

Hermit crabs
Terrestrial crustaceans
Taxa named by Sidney Irving Smith
Decapod families